Nationality words link to articles with information on the nation's poetry or literature (for instance, Irish or France).

Events

 January – Canadian Poetry Magazine first published by the Canadian Authors Association, with E. J. Pratt's active involvement. It becomes associated with more traditional poetry, very popular in Canada at this time.
 May
 In Nazi Germany, the SS magazine Das Schwarze Korps attacks the expressionist and experimental poetry of German Gottfried Benn as degenerate, Jewish and homosexual.
 Greek poet and Communist activist Yiannis Ritsos is inspired to write his landmark poem Epitaphios by a photograph of a dead protester during a massive tobacco-workers demonstration in Thessaloniki; it is published soon afterwards. In August, the right-wing dictatorship of Ioannis Metaxas comes to power in Greece and copies are burned publicly at the foot of the Acropolis in Athens.
 August 18 – 38-year-old Spanish dramatist and poet Federico García Lorca is among those arrested by Francoist militia during the White Terror at the beginning of the Spanish Civil War and is never seen again.
 James Laughlin founds New Directions Publishing in New York, which publishes many modern poets for the first time.
 A version of J. R. R. Tolkien's influential lecture "Beowulf: The Monsters and the Critics" is published in Proceedings of the British Academy.
 W. B. Yeats begins delivering broadcast lectures on the BBC (the lectures continue into 1937), and makes recordings of his own verse.

Works published in English

Canada
 W. E. Collin, The White Savannahs, the first collection of criticism of contemporary poetry in  Canada from a modernist perspective; written by a professor of French at the University of Western Ontario
Kenneth Leslie, Such a Din! Poems. Halifax: McCurdy.
 New Provinces, first anthology of modernist poetry in Canada, including work by F. R. Scott, E. J. Pratt, Robert Finch, A. J. M. Smith, Leo Kennedy, A. M. Klein.
 Marjorie Pickthall, The Complete Poems of Marjorie Pickthall, 2nd edition. (Toronto: McClelland & Stewart). Posthumously published
 Charles G. D. Roberts, Selected Poems of Sir Charles G.D. Roberts. (Toronto: Ryerson).
 Frederick George Scott, Poems

India, in English
 Harindranath Chattopadhyaya, Strange Journey (Poetry in English ), Pondicherry: Bharatha Shakthy Nilayam
 Nilima Devi, The Hidden Face (Poetry in English ), Calcutta: Futurist Publishing House
 P. R. Kaikini, Songs of a Wanderer (Poetry in English) ; Bombay: New Book Co.
 M. S. Nirmal, Song of Immortality (Poetry in English), Lahore: Model Electric Press
 Brajendranath Seal, The Quest Eternal (Poetry in English) 
 Subho Tagore, Peacock Plumes (Poetry/in English ),

New Zealand
 Ursula Bethell, Time and Place: poems by the author of 'From a garden in the Antipodes, Christchurch: Caxton Press
 Robin Hyde:
 Passport to Hell
 Check To Your King

United Kingdom
 W. H. Auden, Look, Stranger!
 Julian Bell, Work for the Winter
 Roy Campbell, Mithraic Emblems
 Cecil Day-Lewis, Noah and the Waters
 T. S. Eliot, Collected Poems 1909–35, including "Burnt Norton", first of the Four Quartets
 John Gawsworth edits anonymously Edwardian Poetry, Book One (anthology)
 A. E. Housman, More Poems
 James Joyce, Collected Poems
 Patrick Kavanagh, Ploughman, and Other Poems
 F. R. Leavis, Revaluation: tradition & development in English poetry rejects Milton, Spenser, and Shelley and praises Donne, Pope, Gerard Manley Hopkins, T. S. Eliot, and others (criticism)
 Louis MacNeice, translation from the original Ancient Greek, The Agamemnon of Aeschylus
 Robert Nichols, A Spanish Triptych
 Ruth Pitter, A Trophy of Arms, preface by James Stephens
 Michael Roberts edits The Faber Book of Modern Verse, which praises poets such as W. H. Auden and T. S. Eliot and ignores poets like Robert Frost and Thomas Hardy (anthology)
 Sacheverell Sitwell, Collected Poems, introductory essay by Edith Sitwell
 William Soutar, A Handful of Earth
 Dylan Thomas, Twenty-five Poems, including "And death shall have no dominion"
 Edward Thomas, Collected Poems, Faber and Faber
 W. B. Yeats, editor, The Oxford Book of Modern Verse 1892-1935 (anthology)

United States
 Conrad Aiken, Time in the Rock
 W. H. Auden, Look, Stranger! (Anglo-American)
 Stephen Vincent Benét, Burning City
 Lilian Bowes Lyon, Bright Feather Fading
 E. E. Cummings, 1/20
 Emily Dickinson, Unpublished Poems
 Paul Engle, Break the Heart's Anger
 John Gould Fletcher, The Epic of Arkansas
 Robert Frost, A Further Range
 Robinson Jeffers, The Beaks of Eagles
 Archibald MacLeish, Public Speech
 Edgar Lee Masters, Poems of People
 Marianne Moore, The Pangolin and Other Verse
 Ogden Nash, The Bad Parents' Garden of Verse
 New Directions publishes its first book and its first "annual", New Directions in Prose and Poetry with contributions from Wallace Stevens, Ezra Pound, Elizabeth Bishop, Marianne Moore, William Carlos Williams and others
 Dorothy Parker, Not So Deep as a Well: Collected Poems
 Kenneth Patchen, Before the Grave
 Frederic Prokosch, The Assassins
 Lizette Woodworth Reese, The Old House in the Country
 Charles Reznikoff, Separate Way, including "The Socialists of Vienna" (Objectivist Press)
 Carl Sandburg, The People, Yes, Harcourt Brace Jovanovich
 Winfield Townley Scott, Elegy for Robinson
 Wallace Stevens:
 Ideas of Order, includes "Farewell to Florida," "The Idea of Order at Key West," "Academic Discourse at Havana," "Like Decorations in a Nigger Cemetery," and "A Postcard from the Volcano"), Knopf, enlarged from the 1935 edition
 Owl's Clover, Alcestis Press (contents later incorporated into Opus Posthumous 1952)
 John Hall Wheelock, Poems, 1911–1936
 William Carlos Williams, Adam & Eve & The City

Other in English
 Rex Ingamells, Forgotten People published in Adelaide; including "Garrakeen"; Australia

Works published in other languages

France
 Paul Éluard, pen name of Paul-Eugène Grindel, Les Yeux fertiles
 Francis Jammes, Sources, Paris: Le Divan
 Pierre Jean Jouve, Hélène
 Henri Michaux, Voyage en Grand Garabagne
 Benjamin Péret, Je sublime
 Saint-John Perse, Poème pour Valery Larbaud, Liège: A la Lampe d'Aladdin; France

Indian subcontinent
Including all of the British colonies that later became India, Pakistan, Bangladesh, Sri Lanka and Nepal. Listed alphabetically by first name, regardless of surname:

Bengali
 Mohitlal Majumdar, Smara-garal, Bengali
 Rabindranath Tagore, in these two works as well as in some others of the mid- and early 1930s, the author introduced a new rhythm in poetry that "had a tremendous impact on the modern poets", according to Indian academic Sisir Kumar Das:
 Patrput
 Syamali

Urdu
 Maulana Mohammad Ali Jauhar, "Kulam-i Jauhar", an Urdu poem edited and with an introduction by  Abudul Majid Daryabadi
 Sir Muhammad Iqbal, Zarb-i-Kalim, also rendered "Zarbe Kalim" (or The Rod of Moses), philosophical poetry book in Urdu; the author's third collection in the Urdu language; the 183 poems include some ghazals; divided into six parts, including Islam and Muslims, Education, and Fine Arts (Iqbal also published a book in Persian this year)
 P. T. Narasimhachar (also known as "Pu.Ti.Na."), Mandaliru, 23 lyrics in Sanskritized Urdu
Translation, commentary and critical appreciation of Pas Cheh Bayad Kard and Masnavi Musafir in Urdu by Dr Elahi Bakhsh Akhtar Awan, publishers University Book Agency Peshawar Pakistan, 1960.

Other Indian languages
 Changampuzha Krishna Pillai Ramanan, Malayalam-language poem about the life, love and death of his friend, the poet Edappalli Raghavan Pillai (1909–1936)
 Haridasa Siddhantavagish, Sankara Sambhavam Khandakavya, a mythological poem in Sanskrit
 Idappalli Raghavan Pillai, Maninadam, Malayalam
 Kulachandra Gautam, Prapanica Carca, religious verses in Nepali by an eminent Sanskrit scholar and translator
 Mahadevi Varma, Sandhyagit, considered significant lyrics in the Chayavadi (Indian romanticism) tradition; Hindi
 Mahjoor, Taran-e Vatan, Kashmiri
 Mohan Singh, Save Pattar, Punjabi romantic lyrics
 Sir Muhammad Iqbal, Pas Chih Bayad Kard ay Aqwam-i-Sharq (or What should then be done O people of the East), philosophical poetry book in Persian (Iqbal also published a book in Urdu this year; see above)
 Sumitranandan Pant, Yugant, Hindi poems reflecting the author's transition from the Chayavad (Indian romanticism) tradition to Pragtivad
 Suryakant Tripathi Nirala, Gitika, including poems on God, the beauty of nature, women, national awakening and philosophy; Hindi

Spanish language

Peru
 Rafael Méndez Dorich, Dibujos animados (Lima)
 Enrique Peña Barrenechea, Elegía a Bécquer y retorno a la sombra
 César Vallejo, Nómina de huesos ("Payroll of Bones")
 José Varallanos, Primer cancionero cholo

Spain
 Federico García Lorca (killed this year; see deaths, below):
  Diván del Tamarit (Spanish for "The Diván of Tamarit") written this year, will be published in 1941);
 Sonetos del amor oscuro ("Sonnets of Dark Love") published this year
 Primeras canciones ("First Songs") published this year
 Jorge Guillén, Cántico, second, enlarged edition, with 125 poems in seven sections (first edition, with 75 poems, 1928)
 Miguel Hernández, El rayo que no cesa
 Pedro Salinas, Razón d'amor ("Reason for Love")
 Luis Felipe Vivanco, Cantos de primavera ("Songs of Springtime")

Other languages
 Gottfried Benn, Ausgewählte Gedichte ("Selected Poems"); when first published in May, the book contains two poems that are deleted for the next edition in November : "Mann und Frau gehen durch die Krebsbaracke" and "D-Zug". The vast majority of the first editions are collected and destroyed.
 Paul la Cour, Dette er vort Liv ("This Is Our Life"), Denmark
 Martinus Nijhoff, Het Uur U, Netherlands
 Millosh Gjergj Nikolla ('Migjeni'), Vargjet e lira ("Free Verses"), suppressed by government censors; enlarged edition with two poems deleted published in 1944, Albania
 Cesare Pavese, Lavorare stanca ("Hard Work"), shortened by four poems deleted by Fascist censors; enlarged edition nearly double in size published in 1942; Florence: Solaria, Italy
 August Sang, Estonia

Awards and honors
 Pulitzer Prize for Poetry: Robert P. Tristram Coffin: Strange Holiness

Births
Death years link to the corresponding "[year] in poetry" article:
 February 19 – Frederick Seidel, American poet
 March 19 – Anri Volokhonsky (died 2017), Russian poet
 March 24 – John Robert Colombo, Canadian poet, editor and humorist
 March 25 – Neelamperoor Madhusoodanan Nair (died 2021), Indian Malayalam language poet
 March 31 – Marge Piercy, American poet, novelist and social activist
 April 6 – John Pepper Clark (died 2020), Nigerian poet and playwright originally publishing under the name "J. P. Clark"
 April 17 – Brendan Kennelly, Irish poet and novelist
 April 29 – Alejandra Pizarnik (suicide 1972), Argentinian poet
 May 28 – Fred Chappell, American poet, author and academic
 June 24 – J. H. Prynne, English poet, writer, academic, key figure in the British Poetry Revival and a major contributor to The English Intelligencer
 June 26 – Elisabeth Harvor, Canadian novelist and poet
 June 27 – Lucille Clifton (died 2010), African-American poet and feminist
 July 9 – June Jordan (died 2002), African-American political activist, writer, poet and teacher
 July 11 – Al Mahmud (died 2019), Bengali poet
 September 11 – Sandra Hochman, American poet
 November 4 – C. K. Williams (died 2015), American poet
 November 17 – Tarapada Roy (died 2007), Bengali poet, essayist and short-story writer known for his satirical sense of humour
 November 23 – Mats Traat (died 2022), Estonian poet and writer
 November 25 – William McIlvanney (died 2015), Scottish novelist, short story writer and poet
 November 27 – Dahlia Ravikovitch (died 2005), Israeli poet
 December 1
 George Bowering, Canadian novelist, poet, historian and biographer
 Saqi Farooqi (died 2018), Indian-born Pakistani Urdu poet
 December 4 – Ken Smith (died 2003), English poet, academic and an editor of the quarterly Stand from in 1963 to 1972
 December 17 – Frank Martinus Arion (died 2015), Curaçaoan novelist and poet
 December 26 – Tormod MacGill-Eain (died 2017), Scottish Gaelic comedian, novelist, poet, musician and broadcaster
 December 27 – Sandra Gilbert, American poet, critic and academic
 Also:
 Stewart Conn, Scottish poet and playwright
 Rashid Hussein (died 1977), Palestinian Arabic poet
 Clarence Major, American poet, novelist and painter
 Christopher Wiseman, English-born Canadian poet
 David Young, American poet and translator, editor and co-founder of FIELD magazine

Deaths

Birth years link to the corresponding "[year] in poetry" article:
 January – Jamil Sidqi al-Zahawi, 73, Arab poet, philosopher and champion of women's rights
 January 18 – Rudyard Kipling, 70 (born 1865), English author and poet, winner of the Nobel prize for literature in 1907
 March 1 – Mikhail Kuzmin, 64 (born 1872), Russian poet, novelist and composer
 March 3 – Govinda Krishna Chettur, 37 (born 1898), Indian poet writing in English
 March 6 – Carlos Oquendo de Amat, 31 (born 1905), Peruvian-born poet, author of 5 Meters of Poems (1927)
 April 30 – A. E. Housman, 77 (born 1859), English poet, writer and classical scholar, best known for his cycle of poems A Shropshire Lad
 June 11 – Robert E. Howard, 30 (born 1906), American pulp fiction writer and poet, suicide
 June 14 – G. K. Chesterton, 62 (born 1874), English writer, journalist, poet, biographer and Catholic apologist
 July 4 – Edappally Raghavan Pillai, 27 (born 1909), Indian, Malayalam-language poet, suicide
 August 19 – Federico García Lorca, 38 (born 1898), Spanish dramatist, poet, painter, pianist, composer and emblematic member of the Generation of '27, killed by Nationalist partisans at the beginning of the Spanish Civil War (see "Works published" above)
 September 26 – Harriet Monroe, 75 (born 1860), American editor, scholar, literary critic and patron of the arts best known as founder and longtime editor of Poetry magazine, of a cerebral haemorrhage
 October 5 – J. Slauerhoff, 38 (born 1898), Dutch poet and novelist, of aggravated tuberculosis
 December 28 – John Cornford, 21 (born 1915), English Communist poet, in the Spanish Civil War
 December 31 – Miguel de Unamuno, 72 (born 1864), Spanish essayist, novelist, poet, playwright, and philosopher
 Also:
 Kattakkayathil Cherian Mappila (born 1859), Indian, Malayalam-language poet

See also

 Poetry
 List of poetry awards
 List of years in poetry

Notes

Poetry
20th-century poetry